Alfred Rittmann (23 March 1893 – 19 September 1980) was a leading volcanologist. He was elected President of the International Association of Volcanology for three terms (1954–1963).

Life
Rittmann was the son of a dentist in Basel, Switzerland. He studied music and natural science at the University of Basel and later he changed to the University of Geneva. He received his PhD there (1922) for work on ultramafic rocks of the Ural Mountains.

Rittmann left Geneva to study with Alfred Lacroix in Paris, Friedrich Johann Karl Becke in Vienna, Ernst Anton Wülfing and Victor Mordechai Goldschmidt in Heidelberg. In 1926, the rich banker Immanuel Friedländer founded the Institute for Volcanology in Naples and Rittmann became leading scientist of the institute. His work focused on the Mount Vesuvius and on the island of Ischia. This resulted in his first great work: "Evolution und Differentiation des Somma-Vesuvmagmas" (Rittmann, 1933).

He drew the right conclusion that orogenic uplift volcanism (igneous rocks of the calc series), lacks alkaline basalts (igneous rocks of the sodic series). At the annual meeting of the German Geological Society in January 1939, he was right opposing the idea that the Mid-Atlantic Ridge was an orogenic uplift by compression, and his opposition to disregard the Continental drift theory raised doubts. The work "Über den Zustand des Erdinnern und seine Entstehung aus einem homogenen Urzustand" (Kuhn and Rittmann, 1941) defended the non existence of an iron-nickel Earth core. His work "Orogénèse et volcanisme" (Rittmann, 1951) with collaboration of W. Kuhn demonstrated that crystalline mantle is able to creep under its pressure and temperature. His book "Vulkane und ihre Tätigkeit" was translated in five languages (2 ed.) and it was a standard work on volcanism.

His daughter Loredana Rittmann is too a volcanologist. He received the Gustav-Steinmann-Medaille (1965) and the doctor honoris causa from the University of Bern (1959). The Antarctic volcano Mount Rittmann and the mineral rittmannite (IMA 1987-048, 08.DH.15) were named in his honour.

Quote
Translation

Selected publications
  Note: posthumous.
  Note: posthumous.
  Note: posthumous.

References

 
 
 

1893 births
1980 deaths
Volcanologists
20th-century Swiss geologists
Scientists from Basel-Stadt
University of Geneva alumni